Renzo Burini (10 October 1927 – 25 October 2019) was an Italian professional football player and coach, who played as a striker or as a winger. He was born in Palmanova.

Club career
Burini played for 12 seasons (330 games, 123 goals) in the Italian Serie A for A.C. Milan and S.S. Lazio. He made his debut with Milan at the age of 20, in an 8–1 win over Bari, marking the occasion with a brace. He scored 12 goals during the 1950–51 Serie A season, helping Milan capture the league title after a 44-year wait, and also won the Latin Cup later that season.

He is remembered by Lazio fans for his contribution to winning the first major trophy for the club, the Coppa Italia in 1958, and for his performance in two Derby della Capitale games against cross-city rivals Roma: in Lazio's 1955 3–1 Rome Derby victory, he scored two goals, and in the 1958 edition of the Rome Derby, he scored one and set up Arne Selmosson for another in a 2–1 victory.

International career
Burini made his debut for the Italy national football team on 8 April 1951 in a game against Portugal and scored on his debut. He was a member of the team which took part at the 1948 Summer Olympics.

Style of play
A versatile forward, Burini could play both as a striker and as a winger, and was known for his outstanding pace and eye for goal.

Honours

Club
Milan
 Serie A: 1950–51
 Latin Cup: 1951

Lazio
 Coppa Italia winner: 1957–58.

International
 Represented Italy at the 1948 Summer Olympics.

Individual
 Among the top 10 goalscorers of the Serie A for 3 seasons: 1949–50, 1951–52, 1952–53.
 A.C. Milan Hall of Fame

References

External links
 

1927 births
2019 deaths
Italian footballers
A.C. Milan players
S.S. Lazio players
A.C. Cesena players
Italy international footballers
Serie A players
Serie C players
Serie D players
Olympic footballers of Italy
Footballers at the 1948 Summer Olympics
Italian football managers
Aurora Pro Patria 1919 managers
Association football forwards